Saujana Asahan National Sports Council Complex is a sports and recreation centre located in the town of Pekan Asahan in Jasin District in the Malaysian state of Malacca owned by the National Sports Council of Malaysia (NSC). It began construction on 8 November 2000 and completed on 8 February 2002. The centre was built to organise motivational and team building programmes, Seminars and Indoor and Outdoor activities.

Accommodations
Six types of accommodations are available at the premises:
 VIP House
 Cluster House
 Double Room
 Dormitory
 Chalet
 Camp Site

Facilities
 Grand Hall
 5 Lecture Rooms
 Football Field

See also
 Ministry of Youth and Sports (Malaysia)
 National Sports Council of Malaysia
 Pekan Asahan

References

External links
 

2002 establishments in Malaysia
Buildings and structures in Malacca
Ministry of Youth and Sports (Malaysia)